Sadashivrao Dadoba Mandlik (7 October 1934 – 10 March 2015) was a member of the 15th Lok Sabha of India from Kolhapur. He was a member of the Nationalist Congress Party (NCP) political party.

He served as a member of the 12th Lok Sabha, 13th Lok Sabha and 14th Lok Sabha. He also won the Kagal constituency three times in Maharashtra Legislative Assembly elections during 1985, 1990 and 1995.

References

External links
 Official biographical sketch in Parliament of India website
 

1934 births
2015 deaths
People from Maharashtra
India MPs 1998–1999
India MPs 1999–2004
India MPs 2004–2009
India MPs 2009–2014
People from Kolhapur
Marathi politicians
Maharashtra MLAs 1985–1990
Maharashtra MLAs 1990–1995
Maharashtra MLAs 1995–1999
Nationalist Congress Party politicians from Maharashtra
Lok Sabha members from Maharashtra
Maharashtra municipal councillors
Indian National Congress politicians
Indian Congress (Socialist) politicians
Indian National Congress (U) politicians